Frederik Bos (28 May 1866, Usselo, Overijssel - 11 June 1931, Twekkelo) was a Dutch politician.

1866 births
1931 deaths
Dutch farmers
Members of the House of Representatives (Netherlands)
People from Enschede